Rogers may refer to:

Places
Canada
Rogers Pass (British Columbia)
Rogers Island (Nunavut)

United States
 Rogers, Arkansas, a city
 Rogers, alternate name of Muroc, California, a former settlement
 Rogers, Indiana, an unincorporated community
 Rogers, Kansas, an unincorporated community
 Rogers, Kentucky, an unincorporated community
 Rogers, Minnesota, a city
 Rogers, Nebraska, a village
 Rogers, New Mexico, an unincorporated community
 Rogers, North Dakota, a city
 Rogers, Ohio, a village
 Rogers, Texas, a town
 Rogers, Virginia, an unincorporated community
 Petroleum, West Virginia, also known as Rogers, an unincorporated community
 Rogers County, Oklahoma
 Rogers Island (Connecticut)
 Rogers Island (New York)
 Rogers Brook, Pennsylvania
 Rogers Corner, Michigan, an unincorporated community
 Rogers Creek (Missouri)
 Rogers Creek (Pennsylvania)
 Rogers Island (Connecticut)
 Rogers Island (New York)
 Rogers Lake (disambiguation)
 Mount Rogers, Virginia
 Rogers Pass (Colorado)
 Rogers Pass (Montana)

Elsewhere
 Mount Rogers (Australian Capital Territory), Australia

Companies
 Rogers Communications, a Canadian media corporation
 Rogers Bank, a financial services company
 Rogers Cable, cable provider
 Rogers Hi-Speed Internet, Canadian internet service provider
 Rogers Home Phone, Canadian telephone service provider
 Rogers Media, media, print and publisher
 Rogers Personal TV, Canadian television service provider
 Rogers Radio
 Rogers Sportsnet, Canadian sports channel
 Rogers Telecom, integrated communications provider
 Rogers Wireless, Canadian mobile phone service provider
 Rogers Corporation, an American manufacturer of specialty materials such as laminates
 Rogers Drums, a drum manufacturer
 Rogers Group, a Mauritius-based conglomerate
 Rogers International, the British brand name for the Chinese audio electronics manufacturer Wo Kee Hong Holdings Ltd
 Rogers Locomotive and Machine Works, a major steam locomotive manufacturing company in the 19th century
 Rogers Sugar, a Canadian income trust that includes sugar refining company Rogers Sugar Ltd.
 Rogers Vacuum Tube Company

Schools
 Rogers State University, Claremore, Oklahoma
 Rogers High School (disambiguation)
 Rogers Middle School for the Creative and Performing Arts, Pittsburgh, Pennsylvania

Sports facilities
 Rogers Arena, an arena in Vancouver, British Columbia, Canada
 Rogers Centre, a sports stadium in Toronto, Canada, formerly called "SkyDome"
 Rogers Place, an arena in Edmonton, Alberta, Canada

People
 Rogers (surname)
 Rogers (given name)

Other uses
 , two ships
 Rogers Airfield, a former World War II airfield in Papua New Guinea
 Rogers baronets, an extinct title in the Baronetage of England

See also
 Rodgers
 Rogers City, Michigan, a city
 Justice Rogers (disambiguation)